Vicki Ormond (born 29 September 1982) is an association football player who represented New Zealand.

A forward, Ormond made her full Football Ferns debut as a substitute in a 2–1 loss to Japan on 2 June 2000 and finished her international career with four caps to her credit.

Ormond comes from good football pedigree, her father Duncan Ormond, uncle Ian Ormond and grandfather Bert Ormond all represented the All Whites New Zealand.

References

1982 births
Living people
New Zealand women's association footballers
Women's association football forwards
New Zealand women's international footballers
New Zealand people of Scottish descent